Carmela Mackenna Subercaseaux (1879–1962) was a Chilean pianist and composer. Born in Santiago, to Alberto Mackenna Astorga and Carmela Subercaseaux, she was the great-granddaughter of Chilean hero Juan Mackenna and aunt of composer Alfonso Leng. She studied music theory with Bindo Paoli in Santiago and continued her studies in piano and composition with Conrad Ansorge and Hans Mersmann in Berlin. 
in 1934 she made her debut as a composer in Berlin with Concerto for Piano and Orchestra.

She was successful as both a pianist and composer in Europe, and is identified with expressionist style. In 1936 she won an award for her Mass for Mixed Chorus a Cappella in the International Competition of Church Music held in Frankfurt. The mass was performed by the choir of the Munich Frauenkirche Cathedral in Munich.

Selected works
Concerto for piano and orchestra (1934)
Cello and Piano Duo
Serenade for Flute, Violin, and Piano
Two Little Pieces for Orchestra
Suite Chilena (Chilean Suite) for Piano
Two Poems for Voice and Piano
Trio for Violin, Viola, and Cello
Variations and Prelude for solo piano
Mass for mixed chorus a cappella
Violin Sonata (includes a piano accompaniment)
Sources:

References

1879 births
1962 deaths
Chilean people of Irish descent
Chilean people of French descent
20th-century classical composers
Music educators
Women classical composers
Chilean composers
People from Santiago
Women music educators
20th-century women composers
Carmela